Spoken is the sixth studio album released by the Christian hard rock band Spoken. The album was released on September 25, 2007. Radio singles released from this album include "When Hope Is All You Have" and "Trading in This Troubled Heart".

Critical reception

Awarding the album three and a half stars for CCM Magazine, Andy Argyrakis states, "[Spoken] continue[s] its fiery, hard-rock groundwork, while exploding with additional diversity and heavy-handed experimentation." Russ Breimeier, giving the album four stars at Christianity Today, writes, "The versatility in sound and style ultimately makes this album the best yet from Spoken—even if the first song isn't their strongest." Rating the album an eight out of ten from Cross Rhythms, Jeremy Williams describes, "a heavy album that knows when to pause for breath." Lindsay Wiseman, indicating in a four star review by Jesus Freak Hideout, says, "this album delivers in all aspects." Signaling in a review at The Phantom Tollbooth, Ryan Ro criticizes, "Spoken is yet another unnecessary addition to the  Tooth & Nail catalogue, a faceless band in a sea of faceless bands, a  clone of a clone of a clone.  Pass on this one."

Track listing

Singles
"When Hope Is All You Have"
"Trading In This Troubled Heart"

Personnel
Matt Baird – lead vocals
Jef Cunningham – guitar
Aaron Wiese – guitar
Brandon Thigpen – bass guitar
Oliver Crumpton – drums

Chart performance

References

2007 albums
Spoken (band) albums